The top level domain .cancerresearch, is facilitated by the Australian Cancer Research Foundation. The focus of .cancerresearch is to bring together news, information and leading opinions on cancer prevention, diagnosis, treatment, and cure.

On 15 May 2014, ICANN and Australian Cancer Research Foundation entered into a Registry Agreement under which Australian Cancer Research Foundation operates the .cancerresearch top-level domain.

References

Cancer organisations based in Australia
Top-level domains
Internet properties established in 2015
2015 establishments in Australia